"This Godless Communism" was an American propaganda comics feature that appeared in Treasure Chest, a biweekly, subscription-only comic book distributed in parochial schools from 1946 to 1972.

Designed to inform students of the then-prevalent Western-nation conception of Communism and the Soviet Union, the 10-chapter feature began in Treasure Chest vol. 17, #2 (Sept. 28, 1961), and continued appearing in every second issue until #20. It was drawn by artist Reed Crandall.

The series began with a scenario of what the writers believed might occur should the United States fall to the Soviet Union. After this, the series took a historical approach, giving brief biographies of Karl Marx and Lenin, and depicting Joseph Stalin's rise to power. The series climaxed with an edition about the Russian people, as distinct from the Soviet government.

See also
 Is This Tomorrow (1947)

References 
 Alexander Maxwell, "East Europeans in the Cold War Comic This Godless Communism" in: Chris York, Rafiel York (eds.), Comic Books and the Cold War, 1946–1962: Essays on Graphic Treatment of Communism, the Code and Social Concerns, McFarland, 2012, pp. 190–203.

External links
 Online version
 Archive.org:  This Godless Communism

American comic strips
1946 comics debuts
1972 comics endings
Christian comics
Comics about politics
Anti-communism in the United States